The Torneo Internazionale Città di Treviso is a defunct men's professional tennis tournament. It was held for one year, in November 1984, in Treviso, Italy and was played on indoor carpet courts. The tournament was part of the 1984 Grand Prix circuit.

Finals

Singles

Doubles

References

External links
 ITF tournament edition details

Grand Prix tennis circuit
Tennis tournaments in Italy
Carpet court tennis tournaments
Sports competitions in Treviso